Cartago, which means Carthage in Spanish, is a province of central Costa Rica. It is one of the smallest provinces, however probably the richest of the Spanish Colonial era sites and traditions.

Geography
It is located in the central part of the country and borders the provinces of Limón to the east and San Jose to the west.

The capital is Cartago; until 1823 it was also the capital of Costa Rica, which is now San José. The province covers an area of 3,124.61 km² and has a population of 490,903. It is subdivided into eight cantons and is connected to San José via a four-lane highway.

The highest peak is Cerro de la Muerte at 3,600 meters above sea level, and the lowest point of the province is Turrialba, which is 90 meters above sea level.

Sports

Cartago is the residence of the Primera Division Team, the Club Sport Cartaginés, which play in the Estadio Jose Rafael Fello Meza, located at the south of the city of Cartago, in Barrio Asís.

Cantons

Gallery

References

External links

 
Provinces of Costa Rica